Feng Kun (born 28 December 1978 in Beijing) is a retired China women's national volleyball team setter and captain. She was awarded MVP and Best Setter award at the 2004 Summer Olympics in Athens, where China won the gold medal in volleyball.

Career
Feng started to play volleyball at the age of 12 and was selected for the Beijing volleyball team at 16. A year later she was selected for the national team. During this time the China team was at a low point after years of world dominance in the sport. However, the team began to rejuvenate and won the Asian Championship in 2001, came fourth in the World Championship in 2002, won the World Cup in 2003, and then went on to win at the Olympic Games in Athens, having defeated reigning champions Cuba and come from two sets down in the final to beat Russia.

She won the 2008–09 CEV Cup playing with Asystel Novara and was awarded "Best Setter".

After the end of the 2010/2011 season of the Chinese Volleyball League playing for Guangdong Evergrande V.C., she announced her retirement from professional volleyball in August 2011.

Personal life
In December 2014 she married Kiattipong Radchatagriengkai who is the head coach of Thailand women's national volleyball team.

Clubs
  Beijing
  Asystel Novara (2008–2009)
  Guangdong Evergrande (2009–2011)

Awards

Individuals
 2001 Asian Women's Volleyball Championship "Most Valuable Player"
 2001 Asian Women's Volleyball Championship "Best Setter"
 2001 FIVB World Grand Prix "Best Setter"
 2002 FIVB World Grand Prix "Best Setter"
 2003 FIVB World Grand Prix "Best Setter"
 2003 Montreux Volley Masters "Best Setter"
 2004 Olympic Games "Most Valuable Player"
 2004 Olympic Games "Best Setter"
 2005 Asian Women's Volleyball Championship "Best Setter"
 2005 FIVB World Grand Prix "Best Setter"
 2005 Montreux Volley Masters "Best Setter"
 2005 FIVB Women's Grand Champions Cup "Best Setter"
 2008 Montreux Volley Masters "Best Setter"
 2008–09 CEV Cup "Best Setter"
 2008–09 CEV Cup "Best Blocker"

Clubs
 2008-09 CEV Cup -  Champion, with Asystel Novara

References

External links
 FIVB profile

1978 births
Living people
Chinese women's volleyball players
Olympic bronze medalists for China
Olympic gold medalists for China
Olympic volleyball players of China
Volleyball players from Beijing
Volleyball players at the 2004 Summer Olympics
Volleyball players at the 2008 Summer Olympics
Olympic medalists in volleyball
Medalists at the 2008 Summer Olympics
Medalists at the 2004 Summer Olympics
Asian Games medalists in volleyball
Volleyball players at the 2002 Asian Games
Volleyball players at the 2006 Asian Games
Asian Games gold medalists for China
Medalists at the 2002 Asian Games
Medalists at the 2006 Asian Games
Setters (volleyball)
21st-century Chinese women